Dan Forsberg (born 25 March 1934) is a former Swedish international speedway rider.

Speedway career 
Forsberg was a leading speedway rider in the late 1950s. He reached the final of the Speedway World Championship on two occasions, in the 1952 Individual Speedway World Championship and the 1957 Individual Speedway World Championship.

He rode in the top tier of British Speedway, riding for Birmingham Brummies.

World final appearances

Individual World Championship
 1952 -  London, Wembley Stadium - 6th - 9pts
 1957 -  London, Wembley Stadium - 15th - 2pts

Family
His grandson Billy Forsberg rode for Belle Vue Aces from 2007 to 2009.

References 

1934 births
Swedish speedway riders
Birmingham Brummies riders
Living people